Jacob Henry Stewart (January 15, 1829 – August 25, 1884) was a Representative for the U.S. state of Minnesota.

Early life and education
Stewart was born in Clermont, Columbia County, New York on January 15, 1829. He moved with his parents to Peekskill, New York, where he attended the common schools and was graduated from Phillips Academy. He then attended Yale College to study medicine and graduated from the University Medical College of New York City in 1851, returning to his hometown of Peekskill to practice medicine.

Career 
In 1855, Stewart moved to Saint Paul, Minnesota, becoming the medical officer of Ramsey County in 1856 and then surgeon general of the State of Minnesota from 1857 – 1863. He was a member of the Minnesota Senate in 1858 and 1859, and during the American Civil War he served briefly as a surgeon in the Union Army.

Political career 
Stewart was mayor of Saint Paul in 1864, 1868, and 1872 – 1874, and also served as postmaster of Saint Paul from 1865 – 1870. In 1876, he was elected as a Republican to the 45th congress, serving from March 4, 1877 to March 3, 1879. After leaving office, he served as surveyor general of Minnesota from 1879 – 1882, then resumed the practice of medicine in Saint Paul. He died on August 25, 1884 and is interred in Oakland Cemetery.

References
Minnesota Legislators Past and Present

External links 
 

Mayors of Saint Paul, Minnesota
Minnesota postmasters
Republican Party Minnesota state senators
1829 births
1884 deaths
New York University Grossman School of Medicine alumni
People from Columbia County, New York
People of Minnesota in the American Civil War
People from Peekskill, New York
Phillips Academy alumni
Physicians from Minnesota
Physicians from New York (state)
Republican Party members of the United States House of Representatives from Minnesota
Yale College alumni
19th-century American politicians